Amit Rohidas (born 10 May 1993) is an Indian field hockey player from Odisha. He plays as a defender for the Indian national team and is also the vice-captain of the team. He was a part of the Indian squad that won the bronze medal at the 2020 Summer Olympics.

Life and career
Rohidas was born on 10 May 1993 in Saunamara village of Sundergarh district. He started playing hockey in his village and joined the Panposh Sports Hostel in Rourkela in 2004.

He was selected in the national junior team in 2009. Rohidas was selected in the senior squad for the 2013 Asia Cup in Ipoh where the Indian team won the silver medal. He made a comeback to the Indian side in 2017. Rohidas is the tenth international hockey player to play in the Olympics from Odisha and also the first non-tribal hockey Olympian from Odisha.

References

External links
 
 Amit Rohidas at HockeyIndia.altiusrt.com
 Amit Rohidas at HockeyIndia.org
 
 

1993 births
Living people
People from Sundergarh district
Indian male field hockey players
Field hockey players from Odisha
Male field hockey defenders
Olympic field hockey players of India
Field hockey players at the 2020 Summer Olympics
Field hockey players at the 2018 Commonwealth Games
Field hockey players at the 2018 Asian Games
2018 Men's Hockey World Cup players
Asian Games bronze medalists for India
Asian Games medalists in field hockey
Medalists at the 2018 Asian Games
Olympic bronze medalists for India
Medalists at the 2020 Summer Olympics
Olympic medalists in field hockey
Field hockey players at the 2022 Commonwealth Games
Commonwealth Games silver medallists for India
Commonwealth Games medallists in field hockey
Recipients of the Arjuna Award
2023 Men's FIH Hockey World Cup players
Medallists at the 2022 Commonwealth Games